"The Geebung Polo Club" is a poem by Banjo Paterson, first published in The Antipodean in 1893.  It was also included in his first anthology of bush poetry The Man from Snowy River and Other Verses in 1895.

It is one of Paterson's best-known poems and combines several of the most frequently recurring characteristics of his poetry - humour, tragedy and horses.

The poem's unnamed narrator clearly admires the rough and ready "Geebung Polo Club", who are contrasted with their wealthy city opponents - "The Cuff and Collar Team".

The only geographic reference in the poem is of the Campaspe River, which flows north through central Victoria to the Murray River.

Scottish-Australian bush poet, and acquaintance of Paterson, Will H. Ogilvie penned For the honor of Old England and the glory of the game in 1897.  Although similar in nature to Paterson's earlier-written The Geebung Polo Club, Ogilvie's work was written after an actual polo competition in Parkes, New South Wales, involving Harry 'Breaker' Morant and Ogilvie.

Use in popular culture 
There is a Victorian era hotel in Hawthorn, Victoria that was called The Geebung Polo Club for many years.  Hawthorn is an affluent suburb in the inner city of Melbourne.

There is an annual Geebung polo match held near Dinner Plain in the Victorian Alps.  The teams are the Geebung Polo Club and Cuff N’ Collar.

Between the 1980s and the early 2000s there was also a hotel of this name in the inner Sydney suburb of Redfern on the corner of George and Redfern Streets, which was initially run by Wilton Morley, son of the British actor Robert Morley. Today the Hotel trades as The Redfern.

In an unrelated link to the poem there is a suburb in Brisbane, Queensland called Geebung (postcode 4034).

There is a rugby league team in Broken Hill, New South Wales called the Geebungs.

External links 

   - The Poem.
  - Youtube: Ron Woodward performs the public domain poem.

References 

1893 poems
Poetry by Banjo Paterson
Works originally published in The Antipodean